Daniel Stuart Johnson (born August 30, 1989) is an American professional baseball pitcher who is a free agent. He has played for the Colorado Rockies, Cleveland Indians and Tampa Bay Rays of Major League Baseball and for the Hiroshima Toyo Carp and Tohoku Rakuten Golden Eagles of Nippon Professional Baseball (NPB).

Amateur career
Johnson attended Sunset High School in Beaverton, Oregon. He attended Mount Hood Community College in Gresham, Oregon for two years (2008 and 2009). He then attended Western Oregon University in 2010. An injury kept him from pitching that season, and poor grades limited him to just 11 games played as a position player.

Professional career

Tampa Bay Rays
Undrafted after his junior year of college, Johnson signed a free agent contract with the Tampa Bay Rays on June 24, 2010, after being noticed by a scout at a local American Legion exhibition game. He played for the GCL Rays in 2010. He was released by the Rays on April 20, 2011.

Arizona Diamondbacks
He then signed and played for the Traverse City Beach Bums of the independent baseball Frontier League, until signing a minor league contract with the Arizona Diamondbacks on July 5, 2011. He spent the 2011 through 2013 seasons in the Arizona system, playing for the South Bend Silver Hawks and the Visalia Rawhide. Johnson did not appear in a game in 2013; instead rehabbing a torn Teres Major muscle, that occurred during the 2012 season.

Minnesota Twins
Johnson was released by Arizona after the 2013 season, and again played for Traverse City to start the 2014 season. He signed a minor league contract with the Minnesota Twins on July 28, 2014 and remained in their system through the 2015 season. He played for the Fort Myers Miracle and the Chattanooga Lookouts while with the Twins.

Los Angeles Angels
He signed a minor league contract with the Miami Marlins on November 24, 2015, but was selected by the Los Angeles Angels in the Triple A phase of the 2015 Rule 5 draft on December 10, 2015. He played for the Arkansas Travelers in 2016.

Colorado Rockies
He became a free agent after the 2016 season and signed a minor league contract with the Colorado Rockies on November 18, 2016. He spent the 2017 season with the Hartford Yard Goats. Johnson spent the 2018 minor league season with the Albuquerque Isotopes.

Johnson was called up to the major leagues for the first time on September 4, 2018 and made he debut five days later on September 9.

In 2019, Johnson made the Rockies opening day roster. Johnson was released by the Rockies on October 23, 2019 to seek an opportunity in Japan.

Hiroshima Toyo Carp
On October 25, 2019, Johnson signed a one-year contract with the Hiroshima Toyo Carp of Nippon Professional Baseball.(NPB) On July 10, 2020, Johnson made his NPB debut.

Tohoku Rakuten Golden Eagles
On September 21, 2020, Johnson was traded to the Tohoku Rakuten Golden Eagles in exchange for cash.

On December 2, 2020, he became a free agent.

Cleveland Indians
On February 2, 2021, Johnson was signed by the Cleveland Indians to a minor league contract. He began the 2021 season with the Columbus Clippers, the Indians' Triple-A affiliate.

In May 2021, Johnson was named to the roster of the United States national baseball team for the Americas Qualifying Event.

On July 7, 2021, Johnson was selected to the 40-man roster and added to the Indians’ active roster.

Tampa Bay Rays (second stint)
On July 30, 2021, Johnson was traded to the Tampa Bay Rays along with Jordan Luplow in exchange for Peyton Battenfield. On August 16, Johnson was placed on the 60-day injured list with a sprained right shoulder, with manager Kevin Cash noting that he would miss "significant time." On November 5, 2021, Johnson was outrighted off of the 40-man roster and elected free agency.

Personal life
After the 2016 season, Johnson was not offered a contract by the Angels, and he worked at a lumber yard that offseason before being signed by the Rockies.

See also
Rule 5 draft results

References

External links

1989 births
Living people
Albuquerque Isotopes players
American expatriate baseball players in Japan
Arkansas Travelers players
Baseball players from Oregon
Cañeros de Los Mochis players
Chattanooga Lookouts players
Cleveland Indians players
Colorado Rockies players
Fort Myers Miracle players
Gulf Coast Rays players
Hartford Yard Goats players
Hiroshima Toyo Carp players
Major League Baseball pitchers
Missoula Osprey players
Nippon Professional Baseball pitchers
South Bend Silver Hawks players
Sportspeople from Beaverton, Oregon
Tampa Bay Rays players
Tohoku Rakuten Golden Eagles players
Traverse City Beach Bums players
Visalia Rawhide players
Western Oregon Wolves baseball players